The Sacred Heart Cathedral, the cathedral of the Diocese of Rezekne-Aglona, is located in Rēzekne, Latvia.

History
The church burned down in 1887 during a storm and the following year the works for the new and present neo-Romanesque style church began. Construction was completed in 1902 under the guidance of Florian Viganovskis, dedicated in 1904, and consecrated in 1914.

The church was elevated to a cathedral status on December 2, 1995 with the Ad aptius consulendum bula of Pope John Paul II, when the Diocese of Rezekne-Aglona was created.

See also

Roman Catholicism in Latvia
Sacred Heart Cathedral (disambiguation)

References

Roman Catholic cathedrals in Latvia
Buildings and structures in Rēzekne
Roman Catholic churches completed in 1902
20th-century Roman Catholic church buildings in Latvia